Mera Rakshak is a 1978 Indian Hindi-language film directed by R. Thyagarajan. Mithun Chakraborty, Rameshwari, Rakesh Pandey and Gayatri play key roles in this film along with a goat who acts as the "Rakshak" (bodyguard) in the film. It was made by C. Dandhayutpani, who firstly gave Haathi Mere Saathi to Rajesh Khanna and Tanuja, followed by Jaanwar Aur Insaan to Shashi Kapoor and Rakhee Gulzar, Do Aur Do Paanch to Shashi Kapoor, Amitabh Bachchan, Hema Malini and Parveen Babi and Shubh Din to a newcomer, Rajesh Lahar. The film was a remake of the Tamil movie Aattukara Alamelu.

Cast
Mithun Chakraborty as Vijay
Rameshwari as Bijli
Abhi Bhattacharya as Bansi Kaka
Shreeram Lagoo
Gayathri
Ram Govind as Lawyer
Rakesh Pandey
Jayamalini

Music
Lyricist and music director: Ravindra Jain

References

External links
 

1978 films
1970s Hindi-language films
Films scored by Ravindra Jain
Hindi remakes of Tamil films
Films directed by R. Thyagarajan (director)